Joaquín Filba (1 January 1923 – 15 August 2012) was a Spanish cyclist, who was professional between 1945 and 1955. From 1945 to 1951 he competed as an individual. Filba notably won the 1949 Vuelta a Levante, and also finished fifth at the world cyclo-cross championships in 1953.

Biography
Joaquín Filba was born in Sant Antoni de Vilamajor, Catalonia on January 1, 1923 and died in Sant Antoni de Vilamajor in 2012 at the age of 89. Filba finished 2nd in the 1953 and 3rd in the 1947 editions of the Gran Premio de Catalunya, and won a stage in 1950. He was also the team director of the Moià Cycling Association. Filba competed in the 1947 and 1955 Vuelta a España.

Major results

1945
 8th Overall Volta a Catalunya
1946
 9th Trofeo Jaumendreu
1947
 3rd Overall Gran Premio de Cataluña
 4th Overall Volta a Catalunya
1948
 1st Circuito Ribera Jalon
 3rd Subida a Arrate
 4th Overall Gran Premio de Cataluña
1949
 1st  Overall Vuelta a Levante
1st Stages 1, 2 4b & 5
 1st Road race, Barcelona Road Championships
 6th Trofeo Jaumendreu
1950
 1st Stages 3b & 5 Gran Premio de Cataluña
 2nd Trofeo Jaumendreu
 6th Trofeo Masferrer
1951
 10th Overall Volta a Catalunya
1952
 7th Overall Gran Premio de Cataluña
1st Stage 2 (ITT)
1953
 2nd Overall Gran Premio Cataluña
 10th Overall Volta a Catalunya

Vuelta a España results 
 1947: DNF
 1955: 45th

Cyclo-Cross results 
 1947–1948:3rd
 1952–1953:2nd
 1953:5th

References

External links
 

1923 births
2012 deaths
Spanish male cyclists
Volta a Catalunya cyclists
People from Vallès Oriental
Sportspeople from the Province of Barcelona
Cyclists from Catalonia
20th-century Spanish people